The Second Hashimoto Cabinet governed Japan from November 1996 to July 1998 under the leadership of Ryutaro Hashimoto.

Political background
Hashimoto had become Prime Minister in January 1996 at the head of a three-party coalition, and was returned to office in the general election of November 1996. While the coalition parties (the Liberal Democratic Party, the Social Democratic Party and the New Party Sakigake) won a slim majority in the House of Representatives, the SDP and NPS had seen their popularity collapse due to their association with the coalition, and decided to remain outside the government. Therefore, Hashimoto formed a minority, wholly LDP government (the first since 1993) with the promise of SDP and NPS support when he was elected by the National Diet on November 7. He promised to continue his policies of "six great reforms" in the areas of administration, financial markets, education, social security, fiscal policy and economic policy, and appointed several former ministers to cabinet to help achieve this.

Less than a year into Hashimoto's second term in September 1997, the LDP regained a slim majority in the lower house due to defections from, and eventual break up of the opposition New Frontier Party, although the government maintained its alliance with the SDP and NPS. Several days later, Hashimoto conducted a cabinet reshuffle, which backfired when he was severely criticised for his appointment of Koko Sato, who had been convicted of bribery in relation to the Lockheed Scandal. This criticism forced Sato to resign after only 11 days in office. The government was damaged further when Finance Minister Hiroshi Mitsuzuka resigned in January 1998 because of a corruption scandal that had been uncovered in the Finance Ministry. At the same time, as part of efforts to close the budget deficit, Hashimoto's government raised the consumption tax in 1998, which negatively affected consumer demand and caused a recession at a time of high unemployment.

By 1998 the poor economic situation, the backlash against economic reforms and the cabinet resignations had greatly diminished Hashimoto's popularity. In the 1998 House of Councillor's election, the LDP lost several seats, leaving the government in a minority. Hashimoto immediately resigned and was replaced by Foreign Minister Keizō Obuchi, who took office on July 30, 1998, and inaugurated the Obuchi Cabinet.

Election of the Prime Minister

Ministers 

R = Member of the House of Representatives
C = Member of the House of Councillors

Cabinet

Reshuffled Cabinet

Changes 
 September 22, 1997 - Director of the Management and Co-Ordination Agency, Koko Sato resigned due to criticism of a previous conviction for bribery in connection with the Lockheed Scandal and was replaced by Sadatoshi Ozato.
 September 27, 1997 - Agriculture Minister Ihei Ochi resigned after suffering a stroke and was replaced with Yoshinobu Shimamura.
 January 28, 1998 - Finance Minister Hiroshi Mitsuzuka resigned to take responsibility for departmental corruption and was replaced with Hikaru Matsunaga.

References

External links 
Lists of Ministers at the Kantei: 
 Second Hashimoto Cabinet 
 (reshuffled) 

Cabinet of Japan
1996 establishments in Japan
1998 disestablishments in Japan
Cabinets established in 1996
Cabinets disestablished in 1998